is a railway station operated by Kobe Electric Railway Co., Ltd. in Hyogo-ku, Kobe, Hyōgo Prefecture, Japan.

Lines
Kobe Electric Railway
Arima Line, Kobe Kosoku Line
Kobe Rapid Transit Railway Co., Ltd. owns the tracks of the Shintetsu Kobe Kosoku Line as the Namboku Line of the Category-3 Railway Operator, and Shintetsu operates the trains on the line as Category-2 Railway Operator.

There is also a connection to the following line.
Kobe Municipal Subway
Seishin-Yamate Line - Minatogawa-koen Station

Buse Routes
Kobe City Bus: Minatogawa-koen-nishiguchi
Kobe City Transportation Promotion Co. Yamate Route: Minatogawa-koen-higashiguchi

Layout
This station has ticket gates on the 1st basement, and an island platform serving 2 tracks on the 2nd basement.

Surroundings
Minatogawa Park
Hyogo Ward Office
Hyogo Police Station
Hyogo Fire Station

Adjacent stations

Railway stations in Hyōgo Prefecture
Stations of Kobe Electric Railway
Railway stations in Japan opened in 1928